is a Japanese female idol group from Akihabara, Tokyo. Their music generally follows the style of denpa song. All of its members are said to be former otaku.

The group was formed in 2008 by producer Maiko Fukushima, and released one indie single before undergoing some member changes and being signed to Lantis and Toy's Factory. Since then, they have released several charting singles and albums, performed many concerts around the world, and appeared in several television shows and a 2013 film.

Members 
Source:

Former members

Timeline

History

2007–2012: Formation, member flexibility era

In December 2008, DearStage salespeople Mirin Furukawa and Akari Owada formed the original  and released the single "Mirror Magic?" through an indie label. Fukushima said of the unit's name: "I wanted to give it a retrotic name like Ushiroyubi Sasaregumi."

In June 2009, Meme Nishimura (now Risa Aizawa) and Nemu Yumemi joined.

Taking this opportunity, Fukushima considered changing Dempagumi's name to "renew it to a new feeling", and I will consult with Saeki. Saeki proposed "Chapé's Fountain"
 but Fukushima wanted to keep the Dempagumi name and said "If it has an extension (a la MOSAIC.WAV, LOVE.EXE, etc.), it may be good for Akiba[hara]." So was proposed that ".inc" would be added, renaming it "Dempagumi.inc".

Various accounts vary about the reason "inc" was selected. The meaning of "Dempagumi's evolutionary system" was once considered. According to Saeki, it is absolutely necessary to avoid unit names ending in "gumi" because they will be a follow-up to the aforementioned Ushiroyubi Sasaregumi. Another reason is that "it would be interesting "inc" was added to the end of a company [name]".

In addition, according to Yumemi, "The interpretation that Aizawa and Yumemi joined 'Dempagumi' and renamed it Dempagumi.inc is a little different." It is also said that it was four people of Furukawa, Owada, Aizawa, and Yumemu who happened to have passed, and it is said that it was something which was collected regardless of the original "Dempagumi". Although the original name is "でんぱ組.inc", the debut single released by Lantis mistakenly named them as "でんぱ組inc."

Eitaso and Miu Atobe joined on June 3, and Owada graduated on July 8. On August 15, Meme Nishimura was renamed Risa Aizawa, and on January 28, 2011, Eitaso was renamed Eimi Naruse. On July 6, the second single "", Denpagumi.inc's first single release, was released from Lantis, and Aizawa became the group leader at the same time.

On September 9, they were transferred to MEME TOKYO, a label newly co-founded by Fukushima and Toy's Factory. Their third single  was released on November 16, and their first album, was released on December 14 by MEME TOKYO. After their first one-man performance at Harajuku Astro Hall, Atobe graduated, and Moga Mogami and Ayane Fujisaki joined.

2012–2015: One Man Tour, Nippon Budokan, Oricon #1

On February 26, 2012, they were champions in the 1st Idol Yokocho Cup!!. Their fourth and fifth singles were released on May 23 and July 18. On June 15,  debuted Dempagumi.inc's variety show . On September 16, the first one-man live was held with six members, and in the show, Furukawa stated "The members discussed and set goals, and they wanted six people to [perform] at [Nippon] Budokan!".

Dempagumi.inc's first tour was held from January 5 to 20, 2013. On January 16, their sixth single, was released, and become their first Oricon Singles Chart Top 10 single, and their seventh single was released on May 29, charting at #6. Their eighth single was released on October 2, and their second album "" was released on December 11. The band's official fan club, started on May 28, 2013.

The second national tour started on January 4, 2014. During Day 2,  was projected on the screen, and it was a surprise announcement that the Nippon Budokan performance would be held. The members who had not been informed in advance cried, and Furukawa said, "I am really happy because I wanted to go to the Budokan during this year," and "a dream really comes true." The performance was held on May 6, and drew a crowd of 10,000 people.

On March 12, the ninth single  was released, and two more on May 14 and July 30. A national live house tour was held from July 23 to September 2.

On October 19, their first show on terrestrial television,  debuted on Fuji TV.  On October 25, they performed at "Anime Idol Asia" in Bangkok, Thailand, alongside Yumemiru Adolescence and the Kamen Rider Girls. On November 12 their next single "Ai ga aru kara!!" was released under the "Dempagumi.inc×gdgdYōseis" moniker. On November 26 their next single  was released.

2015–2017: Yoyogi Gymnasium performance, Battle of the Bands tour

On February 10 and 11, 2015, a concert was held at Yoyogi National Gymnasium for two days, with an audience of 20,000. A national tour was held from February 27 to May 6. From July 16 to August 6, they hosted the Battle of the Bands tour "Kagayaki Tour". On June 19 they made their first appearance on Music Station.

Their third album "" was released on February 18. On April 29, for their collaboration unit "Shokotan♥Dempagumi" with Shoko Nakagawa, their single "" was released. On June 13, their 13th single was released. On September 16, their 14th single "" was released, becoming the first one to top the Billboard Japan single charts. In addition, on October 9 and December 18, distribution limited singles were released, and Aizawa worked on the jacket illustrations of both singles.

The "Best Japanese Act" voting at the 2015 MTV Europe Music Awards was held on Twitter on September 15. On October 15 the result of the web voting was to be the Japan representative.

In 2016, three singles were released once a month from January to March. A tour of 30 performances from 21 prefectures was held from January 9 to April 2. Their fourth album "" was released on April 27. A second Battle of the Bands tour was held from July to September. As a tie in with the anime The Disastrous Life of Saiki K., the ending theme was released on August 8, and their 15th single, was released on November 2. On December 21, their first best album was released.

2017–2019: Member count changes in six years
They performed for the "Makukō Arena Tour 2017 Denpa Ryōkō Wi-Fi Kanbi!" in January 2017 in three arenas: the World Memorial Hall; the Makuhari Messe; and for an extra performance on the 20th, the Nippon Budōkai.

On August 6, Mogami announced on her blog that she left the group on the same date:

She later began to work as a solo artist. On September 1, the official site was redesigned to five.

They appeared as a special guest at the reception party of Takashi Murakami's solo exhibition at the Garage Museum of Contemporary Art in Moscow, Russia on September 28 and presented her first live performance with a new five-member system.

At the Osaka Castle Hall on December 30, it was announced that Rin Kaname and Nagi Nemoto would join Dempagumi.inc.

They turned to the space motif orientation from the early days, and in 2018, experienced astronaut training at the Tsukuba Space Center. They also carried out the world's first "stratosphere balloon project in Mongolia" in MV photography. On April 4, their sixteenth single was released.

Dempagumi.inc served as headliner several large festivals, including  2018. On May 23, they performed at "GIRLS POWER LIVE" at Yokohama Arena. From April to July, they held their first one-man national hall tour with seven people, Cosmo Tour 2018-Planetary Exploration-". On July 7th, they made their second appearance at the Kawaguchiko Stella Theater, "July 7 is the Tanabata Festival Arc".  They have also appeared in events across the country and abroad, and also visited three live houses in the "Tohoku Danpa Daisakusen" in early August. Furthermore, from July to September, they also sponsored "Cosmo Tour 2018 – Encounter with the Unknown ~" and "Reunion with the Known –".  On September 26, their 17th single "" was released. In "Okinawa Special Edition" held on October 13 and 14, Nemu Yumemi stated that he would graduate on the second day of Budokan performance on January 7 of the following year and retire in March.

On the first day of 2019, they released their fifth album . Their third Japanese Budokan performance "Cosmo Tour 2019" was on January 6 and 7, with an audience of 20,000. On Day 2, Nemu Yumemi graduated with the last live of the seven-man system, .

The group set out on a new road as they returned to Earth, and held live house tours at three locations in Tomeisaka from the end of March to the end of April. In addition, Fukushima, who had been in charge for a while, returned to production recently this time.

=== 2020–2021: The first sub-units, Eimi Naruse's graduation and addition of new members ===
On April 9, 2020, the first sub-unit,  was formed by the newest members Nemoto Nagi and Rin Kaname with the release of their first single  

In the Live broadcast on November 16, 2020, named "THE FAMILY TOUR 2020 ONLINE FINAL!! I'm sure it will save the universe ... " Naruse announced her graduation at the encore of the show. The graduation performance, named "Ultra ☆ Maximum ☆ Positive ☆ Story !!" was held at Toyosu PIT on February 15–16, 2021. At the end of the second day, five new members, Kozue Aikawa, Rito Amasawa, Ria Kobato, Aozora Sorano, and Hina Takasaki, joined Dempagumi.inc, with the announcement of a new song.

A new sub-unit, Chape No Izumi, was formed on May 5, 2021 with members Ayane Fujisaki, Kozue Aikawa, and Ria Kobato.

On May 20, 2021 Mirin Furukawa entered maternity leave and announced the birth of her son on July 16.

2022-present: Nagi Nemoto's graduation, and Kozue Aikawa's graduation announcement 
In a blog post released on January 11, 2022, it was announced that Nagi Nemoto would graduate from Dempagumi.inc at April 30, 2022, and Niji no Conquistador on April 11, 2022, citing health problems. A solo performance was held on April 30 serving as Nemoto's graduation as an idol.

In a blog post released on October 28, 2022, it was announced that Kozue Aikawa would graduate from Dempagumi.inc at December 31, 2022, citing health problems.  In a blog post released on October 11, 2022, it was also announced that Aikawa also will be absent from future events due to health problems.

Reception
Nikkei Entertainment described Dempagumi.inc and Babymetal as the two breakout idol groups of 2014, and perceived the fandoms' connection thorough music and concept as a common point between the two groups. Originally, the musicality of idols is no holds barred (nandemo ari), and it is said that both idolism and artistism are achieved by narrowing down the genre.

Discography

Singles

Digital Singles

Albums

Live Albums

Live Performance

Notes

References

External links 
 
 

Musical groups from Akihabara
Japanese idol groups
Japanese girl groups
Japanese pop music groups
Musical groups established in 2008
2008 establishments in Japan
Anime musicians
MTV Europe Music Award winners